

This is a list of the National Register of Historic Places listings in Richmond, Virginia.

This is intended to be a complete list of the properties and districts on the National Register of Historic Places in the independent city of Richmond, Virginia, United States.  The locations of National Register properties and districts for which the latitude and longitude coordinates are included below, may be seen in an online map.

There are 229 properties and districts listed on the National Register in the city, including 15 National Historic Landmarks.  Another 3 properties were once listed but have been removed.

Current listings

|}

Former listings

|}

See also

List of National Historic Landmarks in Virginia
National Register of Historic Places listings in Virginia
National Register of Historic Places listings in Chesterfield County, Virginia
National Register of Historic Places listings in Hanover County, Virginia
National Register of Historic Places listings in Henrico County, Virginia

References

 
Richmond